Stephan DuCharme (April 20, 1964, Addis Ababa, Ethiopia)  is an executive with more than 30 years of experience leading organizations in the financial, industrial and retail sectors. He is currently Senior Advisor to L1 Retail and Non-Executive Chairman of the Board of Dia Group.

He is a citizen of United States of America and Germany. He is fluent in English, German, French, Spanish, and Russian.

Biography 
DuCharme graduated with honors from University of California, Berkeley (USA), has an MBA degree from INSEAD business school. From 1987 to 1991, he was a financial analyst in Salomon Brothers Bank.

Since 1992, he has been a vice head of the Moscow office in the European Bank of Reconstruction and Development (EBRD). From 1997 to 2001, he has worked as corporate development, finance and supervisory director in Alfa Group.

In 2001, he left for London and was one of the leaders in SUN Group, where he particularly supervised SUN Interbrew.

DuCharme was a board member of directors in CSA Czech Airlines, Alfa-Bank, and SUN Interbrew Ltd, and was a member of the supervisory board in Iberia Refreshments (Tbilisi, Georgia), as well as a member of the supervisory board in Concern Galnaftogas (Lviv, Ukraine).

From December 2006 to September 2008, he was board member of the Siberian Coal Energy Company, as chairman of Committee of Staff and Rewards, a member of committee of budget, auditing and internal control.

From October 2008 to July 2012, he was a member of the supervisory board at X5 Retail Group, where he was on the head of Stuff Committee. From July 2012 to April 2013 he was acting-, and from April 2013 to November 2015 the chief executive officer at X5 Retail Group.

From November 2015 to march 2022, he was chairman of the supervisory board at X5 Retail Group.

X5 Retail Group (LSE ticker: FIVE) is the largest retailer in Russia. As of 31 March 2017, X5 had 9,817 Company-operated stores. Its store base includes 9,002 Pyaterochka proximity stores, 544 Perekrestok supermarkets, 90 Karusel hypermarkets and 181 convenience stores.

Since March 2016, DuCharme has been a member of the board of trustees at «Rus» Food Foundation.

Since December 2016 he has been the head of L1 Retail. L1 Retail agreed to buy Britain's Holland & Barrett for 1.77 billion pounds ($2.26 billion) in its first acquisition.

DuCharme was executive chairman of the Dia Group between May 2020 and August 2022, and led the thorough transformation of its strategy, business model, processes and offering. In August 2022 the company separated the role of CEO and chairman. DuCharme was appointed non-executive chairman and Martín Tolcachir, until then CEO of Dia Argentina, was appointed Global CEO of Dia Group.

See also 
 Alfa Group
 X5 Retail Group
 Mikhail Fridman

References

Links 
 
 
 
 

1964 births
Living people
Alfa Group
Russian chief executives
Russian corporate directors
Russian business executives
Chief executives in retail
Businesspeople in retailing
People from Addis Ababa
University of California, Berkeley alumni
INSEAD alumni
Russian businesspeople in the United States